Hypsopygia pernigralis is a species of snout moth in the genus Hypsopygia. It was described by Ragonot in 1891, and is known from China and India.

References

Moths described in 1891
Pyralini